Yangyang-class minesweeper is a ship class of minesweepers currently in service on the Republic of Korea Navy.

Its main missions are gathering data of ports in the Korean region, and searching naval mine and minesweeping, in wartime. They sometimes used at finding and recovering North Korean missiles, by using Variable Depth Sonar to detect missile fragments.

Ongjin, second ship of the class, is famous for finding the stern of ROKS Cheonan at the site of the ROKS Cheonan sinking.

History
At the Korean War, Korea did not have proper minesweeping equipment, and it was all about pulling naval mines out of fishing nets or blowing up floating mines with light machine guns. Therefore, North Korea inflicted massive damage by the naval mine. In the 1980s, Korea developed and used 6 Ganggyeong-class minehunters, which were the base of Yangyang-class ships.

In the 1990s, the Navy made an upgraded minehunter design, based on the Ganggyeong-class. The first ship was launched and commissioned in 1999, which was named Yangyang. Two more, Ongjin and Haenam, were launched a few years later. Compared to Ganggyeong-class, Yangyang-class ships improved minesweeping ability, and increased hull size.

Design
They are equipped with Multi-purpose machine gun, a  main gun, and Mine Disposal Vehicle (MDV). They use two Voith Schneider Propellers as propulsion, to control the ship more precisely. To perform minesweeping activities, mechanical/inductive minesweeping device and sonars are equipped.

Officially about 50 crew are boarding the ship.

Hull material
To protect the ship from magnetic mine, the ship's hull is made of fibre-reinforced plastic, which does not have a magnetic attraction, and lasts longer than commonly used material. It also minimized metallic equipment to tightly control the magnetic material inside the ship. Steel objects that are brought into the ship, like canned food, are heavily restricted and strictly controlled.

Naming
The naming of minesweeper ships is taken from the names of counties and towns adjacent to a naval base. For example, Yangyang is the name of Yangyang County, Gangwon Province.

List of ships

See also
 Ganggyeong-class minehunter
 Wonsan-class minelayer
 Nampo-class minelayer

References

Mine warfare vessels of the Republic of Korea Navy
Mine warfare vessel classes